The West Orange Public Schools is a comprehensive community public school district serving students in pre-kindergarten through twelfth grade in West Orange in Essex County, New Jersey, United States.

As of the 2019–20 school year, the district, comprised of 12 schools, had an enrollment of 6,718 students and 632.5 classroom teachers (on an FTE basis), for a student–teacher ratio of 10.6:1.

The district is classified by the New Jersey Department of Education as being in District Factor Group "GH", the third-highest of eight groupings. District Factor Groups organize districts statewide to allow comparison by common socioeconomic characteristics of the local districts. From lowest socioeconomic status to highest, the categories are A, B, CD, DE, FG, GH, I and J.

Since opening its first school in 1895, the district has expanded to include seven elementary schools, three middle schools and one high school. In the 1990s, the district was ranked among the top 1% of schools in the nation by The Washington Post.

Awards, recognition and rankings
During the 2008-09 school year, Hazel Avenue School was recognized with the National Blue Ribbon Schools Program Award of Excellence by the United States Department of Education, the highest award an American school can receive. In 2022, Redwood Elementary was recognized as a National Blue Ribbon School as well.

NAMM named the district in its 2009 survey of the "Best Communities for Music Education", which included 124 school districts nationwide.

Schools 

Schools in the district (with 2019–20 enrollment data from the National Center for Education Statistics) are:
Early education
Betty Maddalena Early Learning Center (with 71 students in PreK)
Elementary schools
Gregory Elementary School (454 students; in grades K-5)
Makeida Hewitt, Principal
Hazel Avenue Elementary School (320; K-5)
Joel Castillo, Principal
Kelly Elementary School (455; PreK-5). The school was renamed in May 2016 in honor of Mark and Scott Kelly, identical twins who attended what was then Pleasantdale School starting in second grade before becoming NASA astronauts.
David Marion, Principal
Mount Pleasant Elementary School (353; K-5)
Julie DiGiacomo, Principal
Redwood Elementary School (509; K-5)
Kimya Jackson, Principal
St. Cloud Elementary School (356; K-5)
Eric Price, Principal
Washington Elementary School (417; K-5)
Marie DeMaio, Principal
Middle schools
Thomas A. Edison Middle School (516; 6)
Xavier M. Fitzgerald, Principal
Steven Melendez, Assistant Principal
Liberty Middle School (536; 7-8)
Xavier M. Fitzgerald, Acting Principal
Stephen Oishalsky, Assistant Principal
Roosevelt Middle School (487; 7-8)
Lionel O. Hush, Principal
Marc J. Lawrence, Assistant Principal
High School
West Orange High School (2,098; 9-12)
Oscar Guerrero, Principal
Lesley Chung, Assistant Principal
Louis Della Pia, Assistant Principal
Kimberly Juirdano-Mancarella, Assistant Principal
Annette Towson, Assistant Principal

Defunct school facilities 
Three schools have occupied the same location on Gaston Street. The first was the original West Orange High School, built in 1898. It burned down in 1913, was rebuilt, and linked by a shared auditorium to Fairmount Avenue Elementary School. In 1912, the elementary school had been built behind the high school with its entrance on Fairmount Avenue. (At that time, Fairmount Avenue ran parallel to Gaston Street but it no longer exists.) In 1922, when a new high school was constructed on Northfield Avenue (now Seton Hall Prep), the old high school was transformed into Gaston Street Junior High School. Fairmount Avenue Elementary School remained the same. In the 1950s, Gaston Street Junior High School closed, and the building was transformed once again and became part of Fairmount Elementary School, and then later into the Board of Education offices. In 1972, Fairmount Elementary School dropped the "Avenue" from its name and it was moved to a new building on the corner of Northfield and Gregory Avenues (now the Golda Och Academy Lower School Campus). The Board of Education offices remained on Gaston Street and took over both old school buildings. In the late 1970s, both buildings were demolished and the Board of Education offices were relocated to Eagle Rock Avenue School. The Gaston Street/Fairmount Avenue land parcel became the site of the Fairmount House (now the John P. Renna Jr.) Senior Citizens Housing Complex. A small portion of the land became an extension of the parking lot for the adjacent Town Hall. 
Eagle Rock Avenue Elementary School – Converted into new Board of Education offices.
Fairmount Elementary School – Sold and became Solomon Schechter Day School Lower Campus (Jewish).
West Orange High School (Northfield Avenue) – Sold and became Seton Hall Preparatory School (Catholic).
West Orange Mountain High School – Built in 1960 as a second high school, located behind Abraham Lincoln Junior High School with its entrance on Conforti Avenue. It became the "new" West Orange High School when the two high schools merged in 1984.
Abraham Lincoln Junior High School – On Pleasant Valley Way, it was adjacent and connected to West Orange Mountain High School through a pair of corridor/bridges.  The two schools shared an auditorium. Later, when West Orange Mountain High School became the "new" West Orange High, Lincoln was closed and the building absorbed by the "new" high school in order to enlarge it.

Administration 
Core members of the district's administration are:
C. Lauren Schoen, Interim Superintendent
Tonya Flowers, Business Administrator / Board Secretary

Board of education
The district's board of education, comprised of five members, sets policy and oversees the fiscal and educational operation of the district through its administration. As a Type II school district, the board's trustees are elected directly by voters to serve three-year terms of office on a staggered basis, with either one or two seats up for election each year held (since 2012) as part of the November general election. The board appoints a superintendent to oversee the day-to-day operation of the district.

References

External links 
West Orange Board of Education / Public Schools

West Orange Public Schools, National Center for Education Statistics

West Orange, New Jersey
New Jersey District Factor Group GH
School districts in Essex County, New Jersey